Tracey Ann Jacobson (born 1965) is an American diplomat and a former United States Ambassador to Turkmenistan, Tajikistan, and Kosovo. She served as the Acting Assistant Secretary of State for International Organization Affairs from January 2017 through October 2017.  She retired then returned to active duty in 2021 as the State Department's Director of the Afghanistan Task Force,  and then as Chargé d’Affaires, ad interim, at the Embassy in Addis Ababa, Ethiopia. She attended Johns Hopkins University.

Education
Jacobson received her Bachelor of Arts from Johns Hopkins University, and her Master of Arts from the Johns Hopkins University Paul H. Nitze School of Advanced International Studies. Jacobson has studied Albanian, Serbian, French, Russian, Spanish, Korean, and Tajiki.

Career
Jacobson served as Deputy Executive Secretary at the National Security Council at the White House, where she facilitated the development of foreign policy initiatives for the National Security Advisor and the President.

Jacobson is a career member of the United States Foreign Service and served overseas in Seoul, South Korea, Nassau, Bahamas, and Moscow, Russia. Her domestic assignments included the Bureau of Intelligence and Research, the Bureau of Western Hemisphere Affairs, and the Office of the Under Secretary for Management. She also served as the Deputy Director of the State Department's Foreign Service Institute.
 
Jacobson served as Deputy Chief of Mission at the U.S. Embassy in Riga, Latvia, as the U.S. Ambassador to Turkmenistan (August 2003-July 2006), and as the United States Ambassador to Tajikistan from August 2006 until resigning from that position in August 2009 (replaced by Kenneth E. Gross Jr. as of 12 August 2009). From 2012 to 2015, Jacobson served as the U.S. Ambassador to Kosovo.

From 2015 to 2017, Jacobson served as the Principal Deputy Assistant Secretary of the Bureau of International Organization Affairs. After the resignation of Assistant Secretary of State for International Organization Affairs Bathsheba N. Crocker in January 2017, Jacobson served as Acting Assistant Secretary until her retirement in October 2017.

Jacobson returned to the Department of State in 2021 as a Senior Advisor, first serving as the State Department's Director of the Afghanistan Task Force. From February 25, 2022, she has served as Chargé d’Affaires, ad interim, at the Embassy in Addis Ababa, Ethiopia.

Personal life
Jacobson is married to David Baugh, a member of the British Diplomatic Service.

References

External links
Succession history from the US embassy Dushanbe web site

1966 births
Living people
Ambassadors of the United States to Turkmenistan
Ambassadors of the United States to Tajikistan
Johns Hopkins University alumni
Ambassadors of the United States to Kosovo
American women ambassadors
Paul H. Nitze School of Advanced International Studies alumni
21st-century American diplomats
21st-century American women